The women's 200 metres at the 2010 European Athletics Championships was held at the Estadi Olímpic Lluís Companys on July 30 and July 31.

Medalists

Records

Schedule

Results

Round 1

Heat 1

Heat 2

Heat 3

Heat 4

Summary

Semifinals
First 3 in each heat and 2 best performers advance to the Final.

Semifinal 1

Semifinal 2

Summary

Final

Wind : +0.1 m/s

References
 Round 1 Results
 Semifinal Results
 Final Results
Full results

200
200 metres at the European Athletics Championships
2010 in women's athletics